Nematogobius is a genus of gobies native to the Atlantic coast of Africa.

Species
There are currently two recognized species in this genus:
 Nematogobius brachynemus Pfaff, 1933
 Nematogobius maindroni (Sauvage, 1880)

References

Gobiidae